Derrick L. Shepard is a former American arena and indoor football defensive lineman. Shepard grew up in Dayton, Ohio, and attended Meadowdale High School. His football ability earned him a scholarship to Georgia Tech, where he participated in football for four years.

After spending two years in training camps with the Miami Dolphins and New England Patriots, Shepard began playing arena football. He played for the Arizona Rattlers and the Detroit Fury, before playing his next 5 years in af2 with the Tennessee Valley Vipers, Cincinnati Swarm and the Louisville Fire.
After playing professionally for 9 years, Shepard became a coach of indoor football for the Miami Valley Silverbacks. He had been the Silverbacks Head Coach, as well as offensive and defensive line coach. In 2011, he led the Silverbacks to a .500 winning percentage, at the time a Silverbacks record.

Early life
He attended Meadowdale High School in Dayton, Ohio.

College career
Upon his graduation, Shepard received a scholarship to play football at Georgia Tech. Shepard redshirted during his first season for Head Coach, Bill Lewis. Shepard saw very little playing time under coach Lewis, who was fired after a 1–7 start to the 1994 season. George O'Leary replaced Lewis for the remaining three games, which Shepard started all three. During his junior year, Shepard scored the first touchdown of his life at any level, when he recovered a fumble and returned it 27 yards for a touchdown, which turned out to be the game winning score in a 28–16 game versus N.C. State. His senior season he had one interception that he return 68 yards. After a 1997 game against Duke, Shepard was named the ACC Defensive Player of the Week.

Statistics

Professional career

Miami Dolphins
After not hearing his named called in the 1998 NFL Draft, Shepard signed as an undrafted free agent with the Miami Dolphins.

New England Patriots
In 1999, Shepard signed as a free agent with the New England Patriots. He was waived on August 1, 1999.

Arizona Rattlers
In 2000, Shepard tried his hand at Arena football, signing with the Arizona Rattlers of the Arena Football League. He recorded 4.5 tackles, 1 sack and two pass breakups on the season.

Detroit Fury
On April 11, 2001, Shepard was traded to the Detroit Fury for Kelvin Ingram. He played in just one game, recording a sack. He was waived on June 20, 2001.

Tennessee Valley Vipers
In 2002, Shepard played for the Tennessee Valley Vipers of the af2.

Cincinnati Swarm
In 2003, Shepard played with the Cincinnati Swarm also of the af2.

Louisville Fire
In 2004, Shepard joined the Louisville Fire, also of the af2. On August 11, 2004, Shepard scored the game-winning touchdown against the Quad City Steamwheelers in a 53–48 game.

Dayton Warbirds

Miami Valley Silverbacks
In 2010, Shepard was an offensive and defensive line coach for the Miami Valley Silverbacks. His former teammate, Brian Wells was hired as the team's head coach in 2010, and he convinced Shepard to suit up for the Silverbacks. Shepard appeared in just a single game, recording one tackle on the season.

Coaching career

Miami Valley/Dayton Silverbacks
In 2008, Shepard was named the head coach of the Miami Valley Silverbacks for the 2009 season. The Silverbacks went 0-10 and decided they would not retain Shepard as head coach.

In 2010, the Silverbacks hired a former teammate and coach of Shephard's in Brian Wells. Wells signed Shepard as a player for the Silverbacks, but after just one game, Shepard joined the coaching staff working with the offensive and defensive lines.

In 2011, Shepard returned to the role of head coach for the Silverbacks, as they had found a new home at Hara Arena in Dayton, Ohio. Shepard led the Silverbacks to a 5–5 record and earned the team their second-straight playoff berth. Their .500 winning percentage for the season was a Silverbacks record, until it was broken in 2012. Following the 2011 season, Shepard resigned as the Silverbacks head coach.

In 2012, Shepard was once again the offensive and defensive line coach for the Silverbacks. He also received a role in the front office as the public relations director.

Dayton Wolfpack
On December 31, 2016, the National Arena League announced Shepard would the first head coach their Dayton expansion team, the Dayton Wolfpack. However, the team would fail to secure a lease for a home arena in time for the season and travelling team based out of Atlanta, Georgia, took on the mantle of the Wolfpack for the 2017 season and Shepard is no longer involved with the team.

Head coaching record

References

1975 births
Living people
American football defensive linemen
Miami Dolphins players
New England Patriots players
Arizona Rattlers players
Detroit Fury players
Dayton Sharks players
Cincinnati Swarm players
Louisville Fire players
Tennessee Valley Vipers players
Georgia Tech Yellow Jackets football players
Players of American football from Dayton, Ohio